The 2018 Laredo mayoral election was held on November 6, 2018 to elect the mayor of Laredo, Texas. It saw the reelection of Pete Saenz.

Primary

General election

References 

Laredo
Mayoral elections in Laredo, Texas
Laredo